China Asset Management Co., Ltd. (ChinaAMC) is one of China's biggest fund families.  The company offers investment managers of National Social Security Fund, corporate annuities, Listed Open-end Fund (LOF), Qualified Domestic Institutional Investor (QDII) funds and Qualified Foreign Institutional Investor (QFII) funds, etc. It is the first exchange-traded fund (ETF) manager in China, and the sole investment manager of Asian Bond Fund China Fund. The company is the first in the industry to initiate the investment philosophy of Research Creates Value. ChinaAMC was established in 1998 and is headquartered in Beijing, China, with branches in Shanghai, Nanjing, Shenzhen, Chengdu, and Hangzhou, and three subsidiaries-China Asset Management (Hong Kong), China Capital Management, and China Wealth Management. Li Yimei is the CEO of the company. As of December 31, 2020, ChinaAMC is one of the largest fund management companies in China with $245.5 billion (RMB 1.59 trillion) in Assets Under Management (including that of subsidiaries), and a client base comprising nearly 60,000 institutional clients and over 164 million retail investors.

According to Wind Information, ChinaAMC is ranked the second in China in terms of mutual funds AUM(excluding money market funds and short-term wealth-management products) by the end of 2019, behind E Fund Management Co., Ltd.

Power Corporation acquired a stake in China Asset Management in 2011, which is followed by another stake purchase by Mackenzie Investments in 2017. Mackenzie is owned by Toronto-listed asset and wealth manager IGM Financial, which is owned by Power Corporation. Together they own 27.8% stake in ChinaAMC. CITIC Securities is the largest shareholder with 62.2% stake.

In 2017, ChinaAMC became the first full-service Chinese asset manager to sign up for the United Nations-supported Principles for Responsible Investment (PRI).

References

External links 
Corporate website

Financial services companies of China
Financial services companies established in 1998
Investment management companies of China